Lepidodactylus aignanus is a species of gecko. It is endemic to Papua New Guinea.

References

Lepidodactylus
Reptiles described in 2019
Taxa named by Edward Frederick Kraus